Polygrammodes runicalis is a moth in the family Crambidae. It was described by Achille Guenée in 1854. It is found in Brazil.

The wingspan is about 53 mm. The wings are yellow, darkest terminally, on the basal half of the forewings and along the inner margin of the hindwings. The markings are fuscous purple with thick subterminal spots or lunules on the interspaces.

References

Spilomelinae
Moths described in 1854
Moths of South America